Malem Hodar is a town (commune rurale) in Senegal. It is the principal municipality and administrative centre of the Malem Hodar Department of the Kaffrine Region.

A decree of 1972 led to the creation of rural communities (communautés rurales) in 1976, since when Malem Hodar was elevated in 2008 to a commune.

History
In 2008 Malem Hodar was created a commune at the same time as the creation of the département of Malem Hodar, for which it is the administrative centre.

Geography
The commune of Malem Hodar is located in the south-east of the arondissement of the same name, covering an area of 625.5 km2 and encompassing 64 villages. The population in 2002 amounted to  inhabitants with a growth rate of 2.25%. The rural community density is 47 inhabitants per km².

See also

Communes of Senegal

References

Populated places in Kaffrine Region
Communes of Senegal
French West Africa